Lepidotrema is a genus of monopisthocotylean monogeneans, belonging to the family Diplectanidae. All its species are parasites on fish.
The type-species is Lepidotrema therapon Johnston & Tiegs, 1922.

The genus Squamodiscus Yamaguti, 1934  is considered a junior synonym of Lepidotrema.

Species
According to the World Register of Marine Species, species include:

 Lepidotrema angustum (Johnston & Tiegs, 1922) 
 Lepidotrema bidyana Murray, 1931 
 Lepidotrema fuliginosum Johnston & Tiegs, 1922 
 Lepidotrema kuwaitense Kritsky, Jimenez-Ruiz & Sey, 2000 
 Lepidotrema longipenis (Yamaguti, 1934) Kritsky, Jiménez-Ruiz & Sey, 2000 
 Lepidotrema simplex (Johnston & Tiegs, 1922) 
 Lepidotrema tenue Johnston & Tiegs, 1922 
 Lepidotrema therapon Johnston & Tiegs, 1922

References

Diplectanidae
Monogenea genera